Amelia is the birth defect of lacking one or more limbs. The term may be modified to indicate the number of legs or arms missing at birth, such as tetra-amelia for the absence of all four limbs. The term is from Greek ἀ- "lack of" plus μέλος (plural: μέλεα or μέλη) "limb".

Symptoms
The diagnosis of amelia syndrome is established clinically and can be made on routine prenatal ultrasonography. WNT3 is the only gene known to be associated with tetra-amelia syndrome. Molecular genetic testing on a clinical basis can be used to diagnose the incidence of the syndrome. The mutation detection frequency is unknown as only a limited number of families have been studied. Affected infants are often stillborn or die shortly after birth.

Description
Amelia may be present as an isolated defect, but it is often associated with major malformations in other organ systems. These frequently include cleft lip and/or palate, body wall defects, malformed head, and defects of the neural tube, kidneys, and diaphragm. Facial clefts may be accompanied by other facial anomalies such as abnormally small jaw, and missing ears or nose. The body wall defects allow internal organs to protrude through the abdomen. Head malformations may be minor to severe with a near absence of the brain. The diaphragm may be herniated or absent and one or both kidneys may be small or absent.

Causes
Between 24 and 36 days after fertilization, development of limb(s) may be impeded. This may eventually lead to complete or partial absence of one or more than one limbs. Tetra-amelia syndrome appears to have an autosomal recessive pattern of inheritance – that is, the parents of an individual with tetra-amelia syndrome each carry one copy of the mutated gene, but do not show signs and symptoms of the condition.

In some cases, amelia may be attributed to health complications during the early stages of pregnancy, including infection, failed abortion or complications associated with removal of an IUD after pregnancy, or use of teratogenic drugs, such as thalidomide.

Management
A prosthesis can be given to compensate for the missing limb(s).

See also
 Amniotic band constriction
 Dysmelia
 Hemimelia
 Phocomelia
 Thalidomide

External links 

2 kittens in same litter born with complete agenesis of the back legs and pelvis; page with X-rays

References

External links

Congenital disorders of musculoskeletal system
Congenital amputations